Adam Duda (born 29 April 1991) is a Polish footballer who plays as a striker for AS Pomorze Gdańsk.

References

External links
 

1991 births
Living people
Sportspeople from Gdańsk
Polish footballers
Association football forwards
Lechia Gdańsk players
Lechia Gdańsk II players
Chojniczanka Chojnice players
Widzew Łódź players
MKP Pogoń Siedlce players
Bałtyk Gdynia players
Ekstraklasa players